Sergei Viktorovich Bautin (11 March 1967 – 31 December 2022) was a Soviet-born ice hockey player who played in the National Hockey League for the Winnipeg Jets, Detroit Red Wings and the San Jose Sharks.

Playing career
Bautin was drafted in the first round, 17th overall, of the 1992 NHL Entry Draft by the Winnipeg Jets.

Bautin ended up playing 130 games for the Jets, scoring 5 goals and 25 assists for 30 points, collecting 176 penalty minutes. He wore the number 3, and was usually paired with fellow Russian Igor Ulanov.

On March 8, 1994, Bautin, along with Bob Essensa, was traded to the Detroit Red Wings for Tim Cheveldae and Dallas Drake. After his stint with Detroit, Sergei then signed on as a Free Agent with the San Jose Sharks in 1995. He played the rest of the 1995–96 season with San Jose's IHL affiliate, the Kansas City Blades.

In addition to his NHL experience, Bautin was a significant member of the 1992 Unified Team (former Soviet Union) where they won the gold medal by beating Canada 3–1.

Bautin continued his career playing for pro teams in Sweden, Germany and Japan before finishing his career in Russia.

After his retirement, he returned to Kansas City, where he worked as the head coach of the Kansas City Outlaws Bantam AA Hockey team. He also ran various hockey camps throughout the summer. He was also involved with Team Kansas, a player development program with an emphasis on team play and chemistry.

In 2010, Bautin started coaching for Colorado Evolution in Stapleton, Colorado. He coached all levels at the B, A, AA, and AAA. Latterly, Bautin coached the Colorado Evolution U15 AAA to 2017 National Runner-Up after losing to the Yale Jr. Bulldogs 7–2. He left Colorado Evolution in Spring of 2018. He was also the head coach of Colorado Thunderbirds 2007 team.

Bautin died on 31 December 2022, at the age of 55.

Career statistics

Regular season and playoffs

International

References

External links

1967 births
2022 deaths
Adirondack Red Wings players
Detroit Red Wings players
Ak Bars Kazan players
HC Dynamo Moscow players
Metallurg Magnitogorsk players
Ice hockey players at the 1992 Winter Olympics
Kansas City Blades players
Krylya Sovetov Moscow players
Luleå HF players
Medalists at the 1992 Winter Olympics
National Hockey League first-round draft picks
Nürnberg Ice Tigers players
Oji Eagles players
Olympic gold medalists for the Unified Team
Olympic ice hockey players of the Unified Team
Olympic medalists in ice hockey
People from Rahachow
Russian ice hockey defencemen
San Jose Sharks players
Soviet ice hockey defencemen
Winnipeg Jets (1979–1996) draft picks
Winnipeg Jets (1979–1996) players